Chaim Yaakov Stein (March 29, 1913 - June 29, 2011) is best known for leading the Telshe Yeshiva at three times in its history: in Lithuania, Cleveland and Wickliffe.

Early life
Chaim Yaakov Stein was born to Binyamin Moshe and Miriam Stein in "the Lithuanian hamlet of Skudvil," where he received his rabbinical ordination from a major Jewish school located there: the Telshe Yeshiva. During World War II he was with those student who fled, and "spent time in labor camps in Siberia."

Later he relocated to Cleveland and rebuilt.

Insight
To a student who later self-described as "attitude that I had just to ask a question for the sake of asking” Stein said  "You are working hard not to understand – you have got to work hard to understand."

End of life
"He outlived his wife, the former Friedel Zaks" ("daughter of Rav Moshe Yehudah Leib Zaks, a brilliant Rav in Russia") and "is survived by four of their five children:" "two sons, Rav Shmuel Zalman Stein, a Rosh Yeshiva in Yeshiva Birchas Chaim in Lakewood, and Rav Binyomin Moshe Stein who lives in Wickliffe,OH" and two married daughters.

A son predeceased Stein.

The New York Times article headlined "Thousands mourn Talmudic scholar" that quoted by name only one Maspid for R' Moshe who, they said was "expressing the sorrow heard in eulogy after eulogy" with Stein's wording: "We are all orphans, we have no father."

One decades-long student said "To many, Rav Chaim was like a father. To many Rav Chaim was like a zaida." Stein died "just four days after the Petira of Hagon Rav Michel Yehuda Lefkowitz, and less than two weeks after the Petira of Hagon Rav Yitzchok Dov Koppelman ZATZAL." Other reports repeated this observation.

The next chance for a followup, "seven and a half years" after his 2005 public reading of "Whoever learns the laws every day is assured that he is destined for the world to come" at the Daf Yomi Siyum HaShas was described as "We will return to you, and you will return to us."

References

1913 births
2011 deaths
American Orthodox rabbis
Rabbis from Ohio
20th-century American rabbis
21st-century American rabbis